The Glaser-Dirks DG-500, and later the DG-505, is a two-seat glider of glass-reinforced plastic and carbon fiber reinforced plastic construction, manufactured in the DG Flugzeugbau GmbH in Bruchsal, Germany. It first flew in 1987.

Design
The glider is a trainer with an 18-metre wingspan or a high-performance glider with 20 or 22 m span. There are also trailing edge flaps with the exception of the Trainer and Orion variants. The 20m version also has winglets. The fuselage has a single wheel main landing gear which retracts into the lower fuselage.

The DG-500/18 is mainly intended for flight training, and is fully aerobatic with +7/-5 g rating. There is also a motorglider version, the DG-500M. The DG-500/22 can carry up to 160 kg of water ballast which is not possible on the trainer version. 
Since 2004, the latest version of the DG-500 has been built as the "DG-505 Orion" in Slovenia.

Past altitude record
The DG-500 once held the all-time altitude record for manned gliders, at 15,460 m (50,720 ft), set on 29 August 2006 by Steve Fossett and Einar Enevoldson, breaking the previous record by 1,713 ft (522 m). It was a standard DG-500M but the engine had been removed and replaced with liquid oxygen tanks. Additional instruments were installed powered by non-rechargeable batteries. The canopy had double-wall glazing and there was a drogue parachute for an emergency descent from high altitude. Pressure suits were worn. The glider is on display at the Seattle Museum of Flight. A new altitude record of 52,172 ft (15,902 m) was set by the Windward Performance Perlan II on September 3, 2017.

Variants
DG-500
Initial production with  span wings.
DG-500/18
Aerobatic version
DG-500/22
high performance sailplane with  span wings
DG-500M
Motorglider version of the DG-500, powered by a retractable pylon mounted  Rotax 535C engine
DG-500T Elan Trainer
 span wings, fixed undercarriage, no flaps, full controls in both cockpits.
DG-505
improved DG-500
DG-505 Orion
Production version built in Slovenia
DG-505MB
Motorglider version of the DG-505 with a retractable Solo 2625-02  engine

Specifications (Elan Trainer)

See also

References

External links

Manufacturer web site

DG Flugzeugbau aircraft
1990s German sailplanes
Motor gliders
Mid-engined aircraft
Single-engined tractor aircraft
T-tail aircraft
Mid-wing aircraft
Aircraft first flown in 1987